William Linn (February 27, 1752 – January 8, 1808) was an American Presbyterian minister and the second President of Queen's College (now Rutgers University), serving in a pro tempore capacity from 1791 to 1795. He was also the first Chaplain of the United States House of Representatives.

Biography
He was born on February 27, 1752, on Shippensburg, Pennsylvania. 

William Linn graduated from the College of New Jersey (now Princeton University) with a Bachelor of Arts (A.B.) in 1772, and was ordained by the Donegal Presbytery in 1775.  After serving as a chaplain in the Continental Army during the American Revolutionary War, Linn served as a minister and a teacher before being appointed a Trustee of Queen's College in 1787. After the death of the Reverend Jacob Rutsen Hardenbergh in 1790 the Board of Trustees appointed Linn to serve as President pro tempore of Queen's College in 1791. During this time, the college fell into financial trouble, and temporarily closed its doors in 1795. Linn served for twenty-one years as a Regent of the University of the State of New York and died in 1808. 
 In 1789 he was elected the first Chaplain of the House of Representatives.

He died on January 8, 1808, in Albany, New York.

References

1752 births
1808 deaths
Clergy in the American Revolution
People of Pennsylvania in the American Revolution
Princeton University alumni
Presidents of Rutgers University
Chaplains of the United States House of Representatives
People from Shippensburg, Pennsylvania
People of colonial New Jersey